"Invisible" is a song by Irish rock band U2. Unveiled in a Super Bowl XLVIII television advertisement, it was available as a free digital download through the iTunes Store from 2–3 February 2014. Bank of America gave $1 for each download of the track to (RED), an organisation co-founded by Bono, to fight AIDS. Since 4 February, it has been available as a paid download, with all the proceeds also going to (RED). The song was later included as a hidden track on the deluxe edition of the group's 2014 studio album Songs of Innocence.

The electronic-tinged rock anthem was met with generally favourable reviews from music critics. The song has also charted in several countries, and topped the Billboard Adult Alternative Songs chart in the United States. A music video for the song was directed by Mark Romanek and released on 11 February 2014.

Background and release

U2 began work on its 13th studio album, Songs of Innocence, with producer Danger Mouse in 2011. In November 2013, the band released its first new song in four years, "Ordinary Love", recorded for the biographical film Mandela: Long Walk to Freedom; the second song released after the break was "Invisible". However, the latter was not the first official single to promote the album, but rather a "sort of a sneak preview – to remind people we exist," as lead singer Bono told USA Today. The song also launched a partnership between (RED), an organisation founded by Bono and Bobby Shriver, and Bank of America to fight AIDS.

On 16 January 2014, confusion was created when Dave Fanning announced the "first-time play" of "Invisible" live on The Dave Fanning Show on RTÉ 2fm. Instead, a 2012 release titled "Bad Machine" from St Albans-based rock band Dark Stares aired twice. Fanning's close relationship with U2 and an over 33-year history of the band's single exclusives, caused many to believe the broadcast was legitimate and added further debate on U2 fan-forums. Several media outlets also reported on the situation, namely Hot Press and radio broadcaster Alan Cross. However, Fanning later hinted that he was partially behind the hoax, saying, "We did point out that it was a spoof," when interviewed by The Sunday Times. To date, neither U2 nor Dark Stares have officially commented on their respective knowledge or involvement in the stunt.

On 2 February 2014, part of "Invisible" was unveiled in a Super Bowl XLVIII television advertisement, and was made available as a free download from the iTunes Store for 24 hours, with Bank of America giving $1 for each download of the track to (RED) and its recipient, The Global Fund to Fight AIDS, Tuberculosis and Malaria. According to the band's website, the period of time in which the song was available for free was eventually extended to 36 hours, and the total sum raised was $3,138,470. On 4 February 2014, the song was made available as a regular digital download, with all the proceeds also going to (RED).

On 17 February 2014, the band appeared on the debut episode of The Tonight Show Starring Jimmy Fallon and performed "Invisible" on the observation deck of 30 Rockefeller Plaza, with the Manhattan skyline during sunset as a backdrop. The group were accompanied by the Rutgers University drumline.

An alternative, longer version of "Invisible" was eventually released as a hidden track on the deluxe edition of Songs of Innocence, which was released in October 2014. Doug Collette of All About Jazz commented that the song's "patently transparent lyrics set in the context of this package and the benefit of brief hindsight, make for a fitting conclusion of deliberate or accidental self-commentary."

Writing and composition

According to Bono, "Invisible" is a song about him "leaving home with just enough rage to see it through and this feeling of arriving in London, sleeping in the station and coming out into the punk rock explosion that was happening." In a radio interview with BBC Radio 1's Zane Lowe, he explained that "there were really wild, extraordinary people and then you feel deeply not extraordinary. You feel invisible and you're screaming to be seen and you've got your band and this is your whole life. It's that feeling of getting out of town." Bono also said that during the process of writing material for the new album they "went back to why we wanted to be in a band in the first place. It opened up a whole valve for me writing and it was a dam burst of sorts. Punk rock and electronic [music] was when it started for us. We were listening to the Ramones and Kraftwerk and you can hear both of those things on 'Invisible'."

"Invisible" is an electro-tinged rock anthem. It begins with a "brittle, electronic passage," reminiscent of Joy Division. Simple keyboard movements and chiming guitars lead to a "sky-scraping chorus," and lyrics "harnessing notions of self-respect, both the personal kind and the universal-struggle kind."

Critical reception
In a positive review of the song, Randall Roberts of Los Angeles Times called the track "a pleasant surprise and a fairly typical track by the world's biggest rock band," commenting that it "features the kind of grand, aspirational chorus that Bono and buds were born to birth and flies on the wings of a typically sticky guitar melody courtesy of the Edge," and that lyrically, the song conveys "some sort of grandly unified message that speaks truth to power without being too political about it," also typical for U2.

Spin magazine's Marc Hogan called the "founded in togetherness" song "a ringing stadium-rock anthem in All That You Can't Leave Behind mold," with Bono singing "like he's posing for a 21st-century Mount Rushmore."
Michael Cragg of The Guardian wrote of the song, "There's a more textured, characterful feel to it all. By the final coda...you sort of feel happy to have them back."

Chart performance
"Invisible" entered the Irish Singles Chart at number 31, and reached number 24 in its second week. It debuted on the UK Singles Chart at number 65. In the United States, the song debuted at number 28 on the Billboard Alternative Songs chart, with U2 reclaiming the record for the most Alternative Songs appearances in the chart's 25-year archives with 39 songs, passing Pearl Jam (38), Green Day and Red Hot Chili Peppers (both 30). As of March 2014, the single has sold 64,000 copies in the United States.

Music video
A music video for "Invisible" was directed by Mark Romanek, and shot in black-and-white in a Santa Monica airport hangar in January 2014. It shows the band performing the song in front of a captive audience, against a massive screen with multiple video effects, with Bono singing to a circular hangdown microphone. Footage from the video was used in the 60-second Super Bowl commercial, which aired on 2 February 2014. The full-length video premiered on 11 February 2014.

Track listing
Digital download
 "Invisible"  – 3:47

Personnel

U2
Bono – lead vocals
The Edge – guitar, backing vocals, Yamaha CP-80
Adam Clayton – bass guitar
Larry Mullen Jr. – drums, percussion

Additional performers
Danger Mouse – synthesisers, programming
Declan Gaffney – synthesisers, programming

Technical
Danger Mouse – production
Tom Elmhirst – mixing
Ben Baptie – mixing assistance
Declan Gaffney – recording
Kennie Takahashi – additional recording
"Classy" Joe Visciano – recording assistance
Scott Sedillo – mastering

Charts and certifications

Weekly charts

Year-end charts

Certifications

See also

 Timeline of U2

References

External links
Invisible (U2 Discography) at U2.com
Invisible (Lyrics) at U2.com

2014 singles
2014 songs
Black-and-white music videos
Charity singles
Island Records singles
Music videos directed by Mark Romanek
Song recordings produced by Danger Mouse (musician)
Songs written by Adam Clayton
Songs written by Bono
Songs written by the Edge
Songs written by Larry Mullen Jr.
Super Bowl commercials
U2 songs